The 2002 McDonald's All-American Boys Game was an All-star basketball game played on Thursday, April 4, 2002 at the Madison Square Garden in New York City, New York. The game's rosters featured the best and most highly recruited high school boys graduating in 2002. The game was the 25th annual version of the McDonald's All-American Game first played in 1978.

2002 game
The game was telecast live by ESPN. For the 25th game, McDonald's chose a prestigious venue: the Madison Square Garden. 2002 was also the inaugural year of the McDonald's Girls game. The East team was led by JJ Redick, who earned the MVP award by scoring 26 points, which included 5 3-point shots made. Other players who starred were Carmelo Anthony, who entertained the crowd with several dunks and scored 19 points; Rashad McCants, who scored 22 points; Bracey Wright, who recorded a double double with 16 points and 11 rebounds; and Chris Bosh, who had 14 points and 7 rebounds. Of the 24 players, 13 went on to play at least 1 game in the NBA. Two players declared their eligibility for the 2002 NBA Draft: DeAngelo Collins and Amar'e Stoudemire. Stoudemire was selected with the 9th overall pick by the Phoenix Suns, while Collins, who was by far the oldest player in the All-American game at almost 22 years of age, went undrafted and never played in the NBA, opting to play professionally overseas.

East roster

West roster

Coaches
The East team was coached by:
 Head Coach Bob Farrell of Seton Hall Preparatory School (West Orange, New Jersey)
 Asst Coach T.J. Whitaker of Seton Hall Preparatory School (West Orange, New Jersey)

The West team was coached by:
 Head Coach Gary McKnight of Mater Dei High School (Santa Ana, California)
 Asst Coach David Taylor of Mater Dei High School (Santa Ana, California)

All-American Week

Contest winners 
 The 2002 Slam Dunk contest was won by Carmelo Anthony.
 The 2002 3-point shoot-out was won by JJ Redick.

References

External links
McDonald's All-American on the web
McDonald's All-American all-time rosters 
McDonald's All-American rosters at Basketball-Reference.com
Game stats at Realgm.com

2001–02 in American basketball
2002